Bruno Zorzi (born 10 December 1937) is a former Australian rules footballer who played with Fitzroy in the Victorian Football League (VFL). After his initial stint with Fitzroy between 1957 and 1958, he was given a second opportunity in 1960.

Sources
 Holmesby, Russell & Main, Jim (2007). The Encyclopedia of AFL Footballers. 7th ed. Melbourne: Bas Publishing.

External links
 
 

1937 births
Australian rules footballers from Victoria (Australia)
Fitzroy Football Club players
Living people